Charles H. Coons Farm, also known as the Prospect Fruit Farm, is a historic home and farm and national historic district located at Germantown, Columbia County, New York.  The main farmhouse was built about 1880, and is a two-story, rectangular frame dwelling with Italianate style design elements.  It sits o s stone foundation and has an intersecting gable roof. The front facade features a full-width verandah. Also on the property are the contributing New World Dutch Barn and attached shed (c. 1810), Horse Barn (c. 1880), Small Shed (c. 1900), and Windmill and water pump (c. 1910).

It was added to the National Register of Historic Places in 2015.

References 

Historic districts on the National Register of Historic Places in New York (state)
Farms on the National Register of Historic Places in New York (state)
Italianate architecture in New York (state)
Houses completed in 1880
Houses in Columbia County, New York
National Register of Historic Places in Columbia County, New York